The Golden Horse Award for Best Film Editing is given at the Golden Horse Film Awards.

Winners and nominees

2010s

External links 
 Official website 
 Official website 

Golden Horse Film Awards
Film editing awards